Liu Jing (born 8 August 1977) is a Chinese hurdler. Her personal best time was 12.88 seconds, achieved in September 1998 in Beijing.

She won the silver medal at the 1998 Asian Games and the gold medal at the 2006 Asian Games.

From August 2001 to August 2003 she was suspended from the sport, having refused to submit to doping control during an out-of-competition test in Chengdu.

Achievements

References

1977 births
Living people
Chinese female hurdlers
Asian Games medalists in athletics (track and field)
Athletes (track and field) at the 1998 Asian Games
Athletes (track and field) at the 2006 Asian Games
Asian Games gold medalists for China
Asian Games silver medalists for China
Medalists at the 1998 Asian Games